Obsession is the third studio album by English pop singer Shayne Ward. It was released on 15 November 2010 in the United Kingdom, and on 8 February 2011 in the United States. Two retailer exclusive versions of the album will be available, with HMV offering a set of four bonus postcards and Play.com offering signed copies of the album. The album received favourable to average reviews from music critics, who noticed Ward's vocalist qualities, but felt it misses good songs and blamed Simon Cowell and Syco Music for it.

It debuted at number 15 in the UK and number 11 in Ireland. In the UK, its first week sales were 22,452.

Singles
The album was preceded by the lead single "Gotta Be Somebody", a cover version of Nickelback's 2008 song, on 7 November 2010.
The album's second single, Obsession, was only released promotionally, being released on the week of 14 February 2011. Ward performed the song on The Alan Titchmarsh Show and The Graham Norton Show on the week of release. The song was also released to radio, and a promotional CD single was issued. The album's third single is a remixed version of 'Must Be A Reason Why', which will be released on 3 October 2011. The single will be released by featured artist J Pearl, with Ward being credited as the featuring artist instead, due to Ward being dropped from his record deal by Simon Cowell, due to poor sales of the album and lead single.

Background
It was announced in January 2010 that Ward had begun writing his third studio album, with help from American producers RedOne and Taio Cruz. Ward actually worked on the album for about two and a half years, working in several locations in the United States with around 50 producers, as he wanted the album to be different from his first two. Several songs were recorded, including "Oxygen", which was due to be the lead single, "Elevator", a demo of which appears on Ward's official YouTube account, and "Tonight", a duet with Sugababes singer Heidi Range. "Oxygen" was co-written with Danish songwriters Remee and Thomas Troelsen, and was later recorded by Danish pop group Alien Beat Club for their debut album, Diversity (2009). Work continued on the album during the year, with Ward recording further material penned by Savan Kotecha, Quiz & Larossi and Lucas Secon. Work on the album was completed in September 2010, when Ward announced that none of the songs produced by RedOne and Taio Cruz would be included. He later said of the decision: "I needed the right songs to come in. I've recorded about seven albums' worth of tracks, some of which were with Taio Cruz, RedOne and Darkchild which didn't even make the album. They're still in the pipeline." The album's lead single, "Gotta Be Somebody", is a cover of a Nickelback song, first released by them in 2008. The album was originally scheduled to be released in 2009 but the release date was pushed back by the record label. A track called "King of My Castle" featuring American singer Britney Spears was meant to be on the album but was scrapped for unknown reasons. The track leaked on the internet on 25 June 2021.

Critical reception 

Upon its release, the album received generally mixed reviews from music critics. Jon O'Brein from Allmusic gave to the album a rating of 3/5 stars, saying "After a three-year absence, Ward really needed to step up his game to re-establish his pop star credentials. But despite being labelled the U.K. Justin Timberlake early in his career, Obsession's dated sound and consistent mediocrity are more likely to see him dubbed as the U.K. Peter Andre". The Newsround review felt really excited about "Must Be a Reason", which they felt it was a "really high tempo and great to dance to; awesome!" and "Human", which they say it was "a REALLY good song with a nice blend of piano melodies and hard thumping beats". The Entertainment-Focus review was more negative, saying "Obsession is a record that serves to frustrate rather than impress. We can only lay the blame for this patchy effort on the record label. After a three-year wait Obsession doesn't deliver on the anticipation it has built. For the record we absolutely love Shayne but he needs, and deserves, stronger material than this".

David Griffiths from 4Music has stated that "Sadly Shayne's early promise as the British Justin Timberlake has yet to be fully realised and he's a far better vocalist than much of the material gives him credit for. We're particularly curious to hear what happened to the rumoured collaborations with RedOne, Darkchild and Taio Cruz, as they could well have bolstered some of the weaker songs on offer here. Still, it's great to have him back after all this time". The OK! Magazine observe that "Obsession is more polished than Simon Cowell's veneers. The title track – inspired by Prince's legendary Purple Rain – is a swooping belter, while 'Close To Close' is a hook-laden ballad that wouldn't sound out of place on JLS's latest offering". The Guardian described the single 'Must Be A Reason Why' as "Music for evil stumpy Russian men to dance to while wearing budgie smugglers and pretending they're being fellated".

Track listing

Notes
"Must Be a Reason Why..." samples "King of My Castle" as performed by Wamdue Project and written by Chris Brann. Initially a collaboration with Britney Spears was thought, she came to record the demo of the song
"Someone Like You" samples "Two Princes" as performed by Spin Doctors and written by Mark White, Spin Doctors, Eric Schenkman, Chris Barron and Aaron Comess.
"Nobody Knows" is a cover version of the song of the same title as performed by The Tony Rich Project and written by Joe Rich and Don DuBose.

Charts

References

Shayne Ward albums
2010 albums
Syco Music albums
Albums produced by Cutfather